The 2003–04 Bangladeshi cricket season featured the inaugural Test series in Bangladesh between Bangladesh and England.

International tours

English Cricket team in Bangladesh

England played 2 Test matches and 3 one day internationals (ODI) against Bangladesh. England won both the Test matches and won all three ODIs by 7 wickets.

2004 ICC Under-19 World Cup

During February and March 2004 Bangladesh hosted the 2004 ICC Under-19 Cricket World Cup. This tournament featured a number of future international players for Bangladesh, including Enamul Haque Jr who ended the tournament as the highest wicket taker.

Domestic competitions

Honours

National Cricket League

National Cricket One Day League

Other matches

See also
 History of cricket in Bangladesh

References

External sources
 Miscellaneous articles re Bangladesh cricket
 CricInfo re Bangladesh
 CricketArchive re tournaments in Bangladesh

2003 in Bangladeshi cricket
2004 in Bangladeshi cricket
Bangladeshi cricket seasons from 2000–01
Domestic cricket competitions in 2003–04